Barry Mask (born July 25, 1959) is an American politician who served in the Alabama House of Representatives from the 31st district from 2006 to 2013.

References

1959 births
Living people
Republican Party members of the Alabama House of Representatives